Héctor Daniel Rodríguez (born December 11, 1984) is a Mexican professional baseball pitcher for the Saraperos de Saltillo of the Mexican Baseball League and Tomateros de Culiacán of the Mexican Pacific League.

Career

Saraperos de Saltillo
Rodríguez played for the Saraperos de Saltillo of the Mexican League for seven seasons from 2006 to 2012.

Atlanta Braves
The Atlanta Braves signed Rodríguez on August 17, 2012. In 2013, Rodríguez played for the Mexico national baseball team in the 2013 World Baseball Classic. Rodríguez was invited to Spring Training for the 2014 season but did not make the club.

Baltimore Orioles
On January 23, 2015, the Braves traded Rodríguez to the Baltimore Orioles in exchange for cash. On May 5, 2015, Rodríguez was loaned to his former club, the Saraperos de Saltillo. On February 3, 2016, Rodríguez re-signed with the Orioles on a minor league contract.

Mexican League
On April 5, 2016, the Orioles again loaned Rodríguez to the Saraperos de Saltillo. On April 4, 2017, Rodríguez re-signed with the Saraperos for the 2017 season. On April 3, 2019, Rodríguez signed with the Acereros de Monclova. Rodríguez did not play in a game in 2020 due to the cancellation of the Mexican League season because of the COVID-19 pandemic. On November 15, 2022, Rodríguez was traded back to Saltillo.

References

External links

1984 births
Living people
Acereros de Monclova players
Baseball players from Sinaloa
Gwinnett Braves players
Mexican expatriate baseball players in the United States
Mexican League baseball pitchers
Saraperos de Saltillo players
Sportspeople from Culiacán
Tomateros de Culiacán players
2013 World Baseball Classic players
Norfolk Tides players